Aleksandra "Ola" Żelichowska (born 4 November 1984) is a Polish figure skater. She is the 2002 and 2004 Polish bronze medalist.

Competitive highlights

External links
 

1984 births
Living people
Polish female single skaters
Sportspeople from Łódź